The 2012 United States presidential election in Indiana took place on November 6, 2012, as part of the 2012 United States presidential election in which all 50 states plus the District of Columbia participated. Indiana voters chose 11 electors to represent them in the Electoral College via a popular vote pitting incumbent Democratic President Barack Obama and his running mate, Vice President Joe Biden, against Republican challenger and former Massachusetts Governor Mitt Romney and his running mate, Congressman Paul Ryan. Romney and Ryan carried Indiana with 54.1% of the popular vote to Obama's and Biden's 43.9%, thus winning the state's 11 electoral votes.

Indiana was one of just two states (along with North Carolina) which had been won by Obama in 2008 but had flipped to the Republicans in 2012.  Although the state normally leans Republican, in 2008, Obama had been the first Democrat to win Indiana since 1964, albeit by a narrow 1.03% margin. However, unlike North Carolina, Indiana was not seriously contested again by the Obama campaign in 2012, and consequently Romney was able to carry it by a comfortable 10.20%. Obama also lost six counties he had won in 2008.

Obama won in Vigo County, home to Terre Haute, and at the time, a noted bellwether; before 2020, it had voted for the winner of every presidential election all but twice since 1892. After 2012, demographic change and the rightward turn of exurban areas accelerated by the Trump era have made Vigo County uncompetitive to the present day. As of 2020, this election is the most recent time that Delaware, LaPorte, Perry, Porter and Vigo counties went for a Democratic presidential candidate. Obama won nine counties compared to Romney's 83. Mitt Romney won by winning in most rural areas of the state. Romney also did well in the Indianapolis suburbs, Allen County home of Fort Wayne, and Vanderburgh County home of Evansville. As expected, Obama did better in urban, densely populated areas. Obama trounced Romney in Marion County home of Indianapolis as well as Lake County home of Gary and East Chicago. Obama also, for the most part did well in counties that contained major colleges such as Indiana University, Bloomington in Monroe County; Notre Dame University, South Bend in St. Joseph County; Indiana University-Purdue University Indianapolis in Marion County; and Valparaiso University in Porter County.

As of 2022, this is the last time that Indiana has voted to the left of Texas or South Carolina. This was the first election since 1948 that Indiana did not vote for the same candidate as Virginia.

Primaries

Democratic
Incumbent President Barack Obama ran unopposed.

Republican
The Republican primary took place on May 8, 2012.

General election

Campaign
Incumbent Obama didn't visit Indiana, although First Lady Michelle Obama, Vice President Joe Biden and former President Bill Clinton stumped in the state. Meanwhile, the Romney campaign sensed victory in the state, and he visited Indiana several times.

Polling
Republican Nominee Mitt Romney won every pre-election poll conducted in the state by at least 5%, and often by double digits. The average of the final 3 polls had Romney leading Obama 51% to 43%.

Results 

Following Romney's win in Indiana, The Indianapolis Star said that "Voters painted Indiana bright red on Tuesday- with a splash or so of blue" and that "voters also proved that while this state is conservative, it doesn't like to stray too far from the middle".

Results by county

Counties that flipped from Democratic to Republican
 Madison (largest city: Anderson)
 Spencer (largest city: Santa Claus)
 Starke (largest city: Knox)
 Tippecanoe (largest city: Lafayette)
 Vanderburgh (largest city: Evansville)
 Vermillion (largest city: Clinton)

By congressional district
Romney won 7 of 9 congressional districts.

See also
 United States presidential elections in Indiana
 2012 Republican Party presidential debates and forums
 2012 Republican Party presidential primaries
 Results of the 2012 Republican Party presidential primaries

Sources

References

External links
The Green Papers: for Indiana
The Green Papers: Major state elections in chronological order

United States President
Indiana
2012